Gregory (II) from the kindred Monoszló (died after 1256) was a Hungarian noble, who served as ispán of Krassó County in 1255.

Biography
Gregory II was born into the gens Monoszló as the son of Thomas I, who functioned as ispán of Valkó County (1221) and Ban of Slavonia (1228–1229). He also had a brother, Thomas II, the ancestor of the Csupor family, and at least four sisters, including Nabut, who married James from the Héder clan.

He married an unidentified noblewoman from the gens Bő, and was father of three notable barons, Egidius II, Gregory III and prelate Peter II.

Gregory was first mentioned by contemporary sources in 1237, when he shared his inherited property with Thomas II, possibly immediately after their father's death. Later, in 1244, he bought the village of Füzegy, near to Szond in Bács County (Vizić and Sonta in Serbia, respectively), but soon, in 1252, he had to sell that to the Archdiocese of Kalocsa due to its right of pre-emption. He served as ispán of Krassó County in 1255, during the reign of Béla IV of Hungary. Earlier archontological and historical works identified him with that Gregory, who functioned as the first known Judge of the Cumans in 1269. Historian Attila Zsoldos, however, notes, the last mention of Gregory II is from 1256, and there is no record of him about his role in the 1260s civil war. Contrary to Gregory II, his namesake son, Gregory III was a loyal supporter of Duke Stephen, who ruled over the Cuman territories, and through his marriage, he also became brother-in-law of Elizabeth the Cuman, spouse of Stephen.

References

Sources

 
 
 
 

13th-century Hungarian people
Gregory 02